Spin welding is a friction welding technique used on thermoplastic materials, in which the parts to be welded are heated by friction. The heat may be generated by turning on a lathe, a drill press, or a milling machine, where one part is driven by the chuck, and the other is held stationary with the spinning part driven against it. This is continued until the heat of friction between the parts reaches a sufficient level for the parts to weld. The stationary part is then released to spin as well, while pressure is applied along the axis of rotation, holding the parts together as they cool.

In the 1970s, Mattel sold a toy called "Spinwelder", which consisted of a high-speed motor in a handle that spun a small plastic welding rod against a plastic joint to form a bond. Mattel sold construction kits sold for the purpose of assembling with the Spinwelder.

References

Plastic welding